Cumnock is an unincorporated community in Washington Parish, Louisiana, United States. The community is located   N. of Franklinton, Louisiana.

References

Unincorporated communities in Washington Parish, Louisiana
Unincorporated communities in Louisiana